Han Xing (born 8 November 1989) is a Chinese-born Congolese table tennis player. She competed for Congo at the 2012 Summer Olympics and the 2016 Rio Olympics.

References

External links

1989 births
Living people
Table tennis players from Wuhan
Chinese emigrants to the Republic of the Congo
Sportspeople of Chinese descent
Naturalised table tennis players
Naturalized citizens of Republic of the Congo
Sportspeople from Brazzaville
Chinese female table tennis players
Republic of the Congo table tennis players
Table tennis players at the 2012 Summer Olympics
Table tennis players at the 2016 Summer Olympics
Olympic table tennis players of the Republic of Congo
African Games gold medalists for the Republic of the Congo
African Games medalists in table tennis
African Games bronze medalists for the Republic of the Congo
Competitors at the 2011 All-Africa Games
Competitors at the 2015 African Games